ڼ is the twenty-ninth letter of Pashto alphabet. It represents the retroflex nasal which is ण in Devanagari and is transliterated . In Shahmukhi and Saraiki it is written as ݨ.

Forms

References

Pashto